The 1962 Texas A&I Javelinas football team was an American football team that represented the Texas College of Arts and Industries (now known as Texas A&M University–Kingsville) as a member of the Lone Star Conference during the 1962 NCAA College Division football season. In its ninth year under head coach Gil Steinke, the team compiled a 9–0–1 record (6–0–1 against conference opponents), won the Lone Star Conference championship, and outscored opponents by a total of 233 to 64. The team was ranked 6 in the final 1962 AP small college poll and No. 9 in the UPI coaches poll. The team played its home games at Javelina Stadium in Kingsville, Texas.

Schedule

References

Texas AandI
Texas A&M–Kingsville Javelinas football seasons
Lone Star Conference football champion seasons
College football undefeated seasons
Texas AandI Javelinas football